Tears in the Rain (song) a Pop song by Scottish singer Maggie Reilly

Tears in the Rain can also refer to:

Tears in rain monologue, a monologue delivered in the movie Blade Runner
Tears in the Rain, a 1988 television movie
Tears in the Rain, an instrumental rock composition from the Joe Santriani album The Extremist
Tears in the Rain, an R&B song from The Weeknd album Kiss Land
Tears in the Rain, a single by American rock singer Robin Beck
Tears in the Rain, a single by British eurodance group N-Trance
Tears in the Rain, a country song from the Tim McGraw album Tim McGraw
Tears in the Rain, a hard rock song from the Triumph album Classics (Triumph album)